Ian Robins (born 22 February 1952 in Bury, Lancashire) is a former professional footballer who played for Oldham Athletic, Bury and Huddersfield Town.Joined Oldham as an apprentice in August 1967.

References

1952 births
Living people
Footballers from Bury, Greater Manchester
English footballers
English Football League players
Association football forwards
Oldham Athletic A.F.C. players
Bury F.C. players
Huddersfield Town A.F.C. players